Krasnoyarsky is a rural locality (a khutor) and the administrative center of Krasnoyarskoye Rural Settlement, Kotelnikovsky District, Volgograd Oblast, Russia. The population was 1,501 as of 2010. There are 26 streets.

Geography 
Krasnoyarsky is located on the left bank of the Tsimlyansk Reservoir, 44 km north of Kotelnikovo (the district's administrative centre) by road. Chiganaki is the nearest rural locality.

References 

Rural localities in Kotelnikovsky District